Galani is a surname. Notable people with the surname include:

 Arianthe Galani (born 1940), actress
 Dimitra Galani (born 1952), Greek singer and composer

See also
 Angel wings, type of pastry
 Galani, Xanthi, town in Greece
 Galanis, surname

Greek-language surnames
Surnames